Mitontic is a town and one of the 119 Municipalities of Chiapas, in southern Mexico.

As of 2010, the municipality had a total population of 11,157, up from 7,602 as of 2005. It covers an area of 82 km².

As of 2010, the town of Mitontic had a population of 770. Other than the town of Mitontic, the municipality had 20 localities, the largest of which (with 2010 populations in parentheses) were: Chalam (1,345), Tzoeptic (1,295), Chimhucum (1,143), and Oxinam (1,033), classified as rural.

References

Municipalities of Chiapas